Argyrobrithes is a genus of flies in the family Stratiomyidae.

Species
Argyrobrithes albopilosus (Meijere, 1907)
Argyrobrithes argentifer (Kertész, 1914)
Argyrobrithes curtilamellata (Lindner, 1966)
Argyrobrithes fuscicornis (Bezzi, 1914)
Argyrobrithes infera (Walker, 1856)
Argyrobrithes insularis Kertész, 1921
Argyrobrithes separatus (Meijere, 1907)
Argyrobrithes zernyi Lindner, 1943

References

Stratiomyidae
Brachycera genera
Taxa named by Karl Grünberg
Diptera of Africa
Diptera of Asia